Jerka  is a village in the administrative district of Gmina Krzywiń, within Kościan County, Greater Poland Voivodeship, in west-central Poland.

The village has a population of 1,414.

References

Jerka